Chris Essex is an Australian former professional rugby league footballer who played in the 2000s for the Melbourne Storm.

Playing career
In 1997, Essex came off the bench for the Redcliffe Dolphins in their Grand Final win over the Easts Tigers. In 1998, he represented the Queensland Residents team. In 1999, he came off the bench in the Dolphins' Grand Final loss to the Burleigh Bears.

In 2000, Essex joined the Norths Devils, the Melbourne Storm's Queensland Cup feeder club. In Round 16 of the 2000 NRL season, Essex made his NRL debut for the Storm, coming off the bench in their 16–12 win over the Brisbane Broncos.

References

Living people
Australian rugby league players
Melbourne Storm players
Redcliffe Dolphins players
Norths Devils players
Year of birth missing (living people)
Place of birth missing (living people)